Itanagar is the capital and largest town of the Indian state of Arunachal Pradesh. The seat of Arunachal Pradesh Legislative Assembly, the seat of government of Arunachal Pradesh, and the seat of Gauhati High Court permanent bench at Naharlagun are all in Itanagar. Being the hub of all the major economic bases, Itanagar along with the adjacent town of Naharlagun comprising the administrative region of Itanagar Capital Complex Region stretching from the Itanagar Municipal limit at Chandranagar Town extended till Nirjuli Town, is a major junction of Cultural, economic, fashion, education and recreational activities.

Geography
It has an average elevation of 320 metres.

Climate
Itanagar features a humid subtropical climate (Köppen: Cwa), with dry, warm winters and hot, unpleasantly humid and wet summers.

Culture

People

Itanagar is inhabited by a number of tribes viz., Nyishi, Adi, Apatani, Tagin, Galo, Nyishis, and a few others.

Demographics
 India census, Itanagar had a population of 59,490 . Males constitute 53% of the population and females 47%. Itanagar has an average literacy rate of 66.95%, lower than the national average of 74.4%: male literacy is 73.69%, and female literacy is 59.57%. In Itanagar, 15% of the population is under 6 years of age.

Religion
 

The majority of the Tribes are worshipers of the nature with Tani Tribes being descendants of the Forefather Abotani are followers of Donyi-Polo Way-Of-Life . According to the 2011 census, 40.94% of the population is Hindu, 29.51% Christian, 21.17%  Donyi Polo, 4.52% Muslim and 2.88% Buddhist.

Languages
 

 
According to 2011 census, Nishi was the most spoken language in Itanagar with 17,896 speakers followed by Bengali at 8,125, Adi at 8,102, Apatani at 4,256, Nepali at 3,721, Hindi at 3,641, Assamese at 3,538 and Bhojpuri at 1,987.

Education

Universities and colleges
 Dera Natung Government College
 Don Bosco College
 Himalayan University
 NERIST
 National Institute of Technology, Arunachal Pradesh
 Rajiv Gandhi Government Polytechnic
 Rajiv Gandhi University 
Tomo Riba Institute of Health and Medical Sciences

Media and communications

Television
DD Arunprabha is the state-owned television broadcaster of Arunachal Pradesh.

Radio
Radio stations of Itanagar are - All India Radio, RadioCity Itanagar - Arunachal Pradesh's first community radio and Big FM 92.7 - India's largest national radio network .

Newspapers
 The Arunachal Times
 Echo of Arunachal
 Dawnlit post

Places of interest

 Ita Fort, one of the most important historical sites in the state of Arunachal Pradesh. The name literally means "Fort of bricks"( brick being called "Ita" in the Assamese language). The Ita Fort was built as early as the 14th or the 15th century. The fort has an irregular shape, built mainly with bricks dating back to the 14th-15th Century. The total brickwork is of 16,200 cubic meter lengths which have been identified by some scholars with the Chutiya kingdom. The fort has three different entrances at three different sides, which are western, eastern, and southern sides.
 Jawaharlal Nehru Museum, Itanagar is also known for showcasing the rich tribal culture of the state.
 Gekar sinyi (Ganga Lake) is a beautiful natural lake which literally means confined lake in the Nyishi dialect. It is surrounded by a landmass of hard rock. Primeval vegetation, orchids masses on tall trees and tree ferns contribute to its popularity as a hot picnic spot and recreation hub. Boating facilities and a swimming pool are available at the site.
 Buddhist monastery [Gompa mandir]

Transport

Road 
National Highway 415 connects Itanagar to Arunachal Pradesh and the rest of the country. Regular bus and taxi services are available from Guwahati and its airport.

Railway 
Naharlagun railway station is the nearest railway station, which is nearly 15 km away from the city. Taxi and bus services are easily available from the railway station to Itanagar. Donyi Polo Express can be availed which runs on all days of a week from Guwahati and Shatabdi Express is available thrice a week from Guwahati. The Arunachal AC Superfast Express runs between Naharlagun and Anand Vihar Terminal twice a week, which is the only direct train that connects Arunachal Pradesh with the national capital.

Air 
Regular helicopter service is available from Guwahati to Naharlagun. Prime Minister Narendra Modi laid the foundation stone for Itanagar Airport at Hollongi on 9 February 2019. It has been named as Donyi Polo Airport, and was inaugurated on 19 November 2022, with flight services operated by Alliance Air, IndiGo and FlyBig airlines.

See also
 Arunachal Pradesh
 Arunachal Pradesh Legislative Assembly
 Tourism in North East India

References

External links

 
Cities and towns in Papum Pare district
Indian capital cities
Hill stations in Arunachal Pradesh
Tourism in Northeast India